The 2000 Bank of the West Classic was a tennis tournament played on outdoor hard courts that was part of the Tier II Series of the 2000 WTA Tour. It was the 29th edition of the tournament and took place at the Taube Tennis Center in Stanford, California, United States, from July 24 through July 30, 2000. Second-seeded Venus Williams won the singles title and earned $87,000 first-prize money.

Finals

Singles

 Venus Williams defeated  Lindsay Davenport, 6–1, 6–4
It was Williams' 2nd singles title of the year, and the 11th of her career.

Doubles

 Chanda Rubin /  Sandrine Testud defeated  Cara Black /  Amy Frazier, 6–4, 6–4

References

External links
 ITF tournament edition details
 Tournament draws

Bank of the West Classic
Silicon Valley Classic
Bank of the West Classic
Bank of the West Classic
Bank of the West Classic